Manuel Reuter (born 6 December 1961 in Mainz) is a German former race car driver.

He has won the 24 Hours of Le Mans twice:
in 1989 24 Hours of Le Mans for Sauber-Mercedes
in 1996 24 Hours of Le Mans for Joest Racing

He also won the Interserie in 1992 in a Kremer K7 and the Deutsche Tourenwagen Meisterschaft/ITC in 1996 for Opel in an Opel Calibra V6.

Reuter continued to race in the Super Tourenwagen Cup for Opel.

When Opel retired from the Deutsche Tourenwagen Masters after 2005, he also retired. He acted as a commentator for the DTM on German television channel Das Erste from 2007 to 2013.

Racing record

24 Hours of Le Mans results

Bathurst 1000 results

Complete Deutsche Tourenwagen Meisterschaft/Masters results
(key) (Races in bold indicate pole position) (Races in italics indicate fastest lap)

† — Retired, but was classified as he completed 90% of the winner's race distance.

Complete International Touring Car Championship results
(key) (Races in bold indicate pole position) (Races in italics indicate fastest lap)

Complete Super Tourenwagen Cup results
(key) (Races in bold indicate pole position) (Races in italics indicate fastest lap)

References

External links
Manuel Reuter

1961 births
24 Hours of Le Mans drivers
24 Hours of Le Mans winning drivers
Deutsche Tourenwagen Masters champions
Deutsche Tourenwagen Masters drivers
German racing drivers
Living people
Opel people
Sportspeople from Mainz
Racing drivers from Rhineland-Palatinate
Porsche Supercup drivers
World Sportscar Championship drivers
Porsche Motorsports drivers
Team Joest drivers
Phoenix Racing drivers
Josef Kaufmann Racing drivers
German Formula Three Championship drivers
Nürburgring 24 Hours drivers
Sauber Motorsport drivers